Brigitte Lebens Nacos (born 1936) is an Adjunct Professor in political science at Columbia University. She has written on the news media, the politics of Germany, and terrorism.

She is a joint author of a paper, "Prevention of Terrorism in Post-9/11 America" which was delivered at the Summer 2006 meeting of the American Political Science Association; the paper addresses the correlation between increases in terrorism alert levels and the popularity of U.S. President George W. Bush. Referring to her study of terrorism alerts, media coverage, and Bush's popularity, journalist Matthew Stannard wrote in the San Francisco Chronicle that "The media will repeat the president's remarks. Public fear of terrorism will increase. And the president's poll numbers will rise."

Education 
Nacos holds a B.A., M.Phil., and Ph.D., all from Columbia University.

Selected publications
 The Press. New York, Columbia University Press. 1990. 
 Terrorism and the Media. New York, Columbia University Press, 1996, rev. 2nd ed. 
 From Bonn to Berlin. Lewis J. Edinger and Brigitte L. Nacos. New York, Columbia University Press, 1998. 
 Decisionmaking in a Glass House: Mass Media, Public Opinion, and American and European Foreign Policy in the 21st Century. Brigitte L. Nacos, and others, editors. London, Rowman & Littlefield Publishers, Inc. 2000. 
 Mass Mediated Terrorism: The Central Role of the Media in Terrorism and Counterterrorism. London: Rowman & Littlefield Publishers, Inc. 2002. 
 Terrorism and Counterterrorism: Understanding Threats and Responses in the Post-9/11 World (Penguin Academics Series). New York: Penguin, 2005. 
 Fueling Our Fears: Stereotyping, Media Coverage, and Public Opinion of Muslim Americans. London: Rowman & Littlefield Publishers, Inc. 2006. 
  Available in PDF. 
Nacos, Brigitte; Yaeli Bloch-Elkin; Robert Shapiro (2011). Selling Fear: Counterterrorism, the Media, and Public Opinion. Chicago: University of Chicago Press.

See also
German model
Mass media and public opinion
Media influence
Politics of Germany
Public opinion
Theories of political behavior

Notes

External links
Blog by Nacos

Columbia University faculty
Mass media theorists
Counterterrorism in the United States
Media historians
American women political scientists
American political scientists
1936 births
Living people
American women academics
21st-century American women

Columbia Graduate School of Arts and Sciences alumni